Manesh may refer to:
Marshall Manesh (b. 1950), American actor
Manesh, Iran, a village in Sistan and Baluchestan Province, Iran
Manesh, North Khorasan, a village in North Khorasan Province, Iran